Heteronema is a genus of phagotrophic, flagellated euglenoids that are most widely distributed in fresh water environments. This genus consists of two very distinguishable morphogroups that are phylogenetically closely related. These morphogroups are deciphered based on shape, locomotion and other ultrastructural traits. However, this genus does impose taxonomic problems due to the varying historical descriptions of Heteronema species and its similarity to the genus Paranema. The species H. exaratum, was the first heteronemid with a skidding motion to be sequenced, which led to the discovery that it was not closely related to H. scaphrum, contrary to what was previously assumed, but instead to a sister group of primary osmotrophs. This suggests that skidding heteronemids can also be distinguished phylogenetically, being more closely related to Anisoma, Dinema and Aphageae, than to other species within Heteronema.

Taxonomy
This genus was first described by Félix Dujardin, a French zoologist in 1841 as having variable shape, then typified in 1970 by Bourelly as an Anisonema. In 1970, Stein modified the description to include cells with two flagella and two new species’ descriptions with one containing ingestion rods. There was difficulty separating this genus from Paranema; however, in 1967 Leedale described Parenema to be different based on a more flattened morphology and a trailing flagellum pressed to the side of the cell compared to Heteronema. Now more than 25 species are described under the genus Heteronema.

List of species
The following species are currently recognized:

 H. abrupta Skuja 
 H. abruptum Skuja 
 H. aciforme Z.X.Shi 
 H. acus (Ehrenberg) F.Stein 
 H. acuta Wawrik 
 H. acutissimum Lemmermann 
 H. aquae Skvortzov 
 H. bifurcata H.Silva 
 H. capitatum Z.X.Shi 
 H. citriformis Wawrik
 H. diaphana Skuja 
 H. diaphanum Skuja 
 H. discomorphum Skuja 
 H. distigmoides Christen 
 H. distigmoides Christen 
 H. eneydae Skvortzov
 H. fidalgae Skvortzov 
 H. fusiforme Skvortzov
 H. globuliferum (Ehrenberg) F.Stein
 H. hexagonum (Playfair) Skuja 
 H. invaginata Prowse 
 H. klebsii Senn 
 H. leptosoma Skuja 
 H. leptosomum Skuja
 H. longiovata H.Silva 
 H. marina Dujardin 
 H. medusae Skvortzov 
 H. metabolissimum Wawrik 
 H. mutabile (A.C.Stokes) Lemmermann 
 H. nebuloglabrum H.Silva
 H. ovalis Kahl 
 H. palmeri Skvortzov 
 H. plicata Skuja 
 H. plicatum Skuja 
 H. polymorphum Deflandre 
 H. proteus Christen 
 H. punctato Skvortzov
 H. robusta Skvortzov 
 H. rosae-mariae Skvortzov 
 H. sacculus Skuja 
 H. saopaulensis Skvortzov 
 H. scabra Z.Cyrus
 H. shii D.Kapustin & Davydov 
 H. similis Skvortzov Skvortzov 
 H. spirale Klebs 
 H. spiralis Klebs 
 H. spirogyra Skuja 
 H. splendens J.Larsen & D.J.Patterson 
 H. subsucculus Z.Shi 
 H. taurica Vetrova 
 H. tortum Z.Shi 
 H. tortuosa Christen
 H. tortuosum Christen 
 H. trachelomonades Skvortzov 
 H. tremulum Zacharias 
 H. trispira Matvienko
 H. vetrovae D.Kapustin & Davydov 
 H. vittatum J.Larsen & D.J.Patterson

Description
This genus consists of diverse, colourless euglenoids that range in size from 8-75um. Individuals are assigned to this genus if they have characteristic such as an ingestion apparatus, a capacity for flagellar movement and a recurrent flagellum that is not adpressed to the ventral side of the cell.
The cells are covered with a large number of proteinaceous pellicle strips with microtubules lined underneath. These pellicle strips are a distinguishing feature of the euglenoids, that allows the cells to undergo metaboly, giving the cell flexibility and movement. Heteronema, under the light microscope, is morphologically similar to Paranema, where both groups are metabolic, have the ability to glide, have visible feedings rods and two different flagellum on opposite ends of the cell.
Heteronema is separated into two specific morphogroups, one consisting of elongate and very flexible cells that move by gliding, holding the anterior flagellum out in front of the cell. This morphogroup includes the species H. scaphrum. In contrast, the second group consists of ovoid, more rigid cells that have a characteristic rapid “skidding” swimming behaviour. Examples of species within this group are H. ovale and H. exaratum. The skidding behaviour is very similar to the primary osmotrophs, where the motion is powered by the beating of the anterior flagellum, positioned in a curve to the right of the cell, in a sinusoidal pattern. This may also reflect the evolution of ancestral phagotrophic euglenoids, where almost all species swam poorly and relied on gliding instead of flagellar movement. The flagella are hollow with heteromorphic paraxonemal rods, covered with sheaths of hairs. In accordance to its name, the anterior emergent flagella is longer and thicker, directed anteriorly and used for locomotion, and the shorter, thinner flagellum is directed posteriorly.
The feeding apparatus is usually quite small, composed of separate microtubule rods and surrounded by spiral striations at the anterior end of the cell.

Habitat and ecology
Heteronema is generally widespread and commonly found in brackish pools and fresh water ponds; however, some species are observed to exist in marine environments. These euglenoids are phagotrophic, making them important in benthic systems and microbial food webs.

Life history
There is no sexual reproduction observed in the euglenoids; however, asexual reproduction can occur through mitosis followed by cytokinesis, where basal bodies and flagellar systems replicate first, followed by the feeding system. After the duplication of the nucleus and cytoskeleton, a cleavage furrow appears, migrating from the flagellar pocket to the anterior opening, and then to the posterior end, separating the parent from the daughter cell.

References 

Euglenozoa